Vyacheslav Dimitrovich Zavalnyuk (born 10 December 1974), is a Ukrainian retired professional ice hockey player. He played for multiple teams during a career that lasted from 1990 until 2007. He also played internationally for the Ukrainian national team at several World Championships, as well as the 2002 Winter Olympics.

Career statistics

Regular season and playoffs

International

External links
 

1974 births
Living people
HC Dynamo Moscow players
HC Sibir Novosibirsk players
Ice hockey players at the 2002 Winter Olympics
Metallurg Magnitogorsk players
Olympic ice hockey players of Ukraine
Severstal Cherepovets players
ShVSM Kyiv players
SKA Saint Petersburg players
Sokil Kyiv players
Sportspeople from Kyiv
Ukrainian ice hockey defencemen